The 2016 Tejano Music Awards was held on November 12, 2016, at the Tobin Center for the Performing Arts in San Antonio, Texas. The deadline for nominations for the various Tejano Music Awards categories by the artists' representative are due by June 19, 2016. Nominations will then be announced at a later date for public voting. The annual 2016 Tejano Fan Fair (which precedes every Tejano Music Awards) was held at the Historic Market Square in San Antonio from March 17–20, 2016.

Winners

 Song of Year/Artist/Group - "Adicta" – Elida Reyna y Avante
 Male Vocalist of the Year - Michael Salgado
 Female Vocalist of the Year - Elida Reyna
 Entertainer of the Year - Elida Reyna
 Album of the Year – Tejano - Adicta – Elida Reyna y Avante
 Album of the Year – Conjunto - Born to be Bad – Jaime y Los Chamacos
 Album of the Year – Norteño - Por Cielo Y Tierra – Michael Salgado
 Album of the Year – Gospel - Grand Symphony – Ricardo Sanchez
 Vocal Duo of the Year - Lucky Joe & Jose Zamora – "Sin Dolor No Hay Olvido"
 Best New Artist – Male - Rigo Navaira – Remedio
 Best New Artist – Female - Destiny Navaira – Remedio
 Best New Artist – Group - Remedio
 Lifetime Achievement Award - Bob Grever

References 

Tejano Music Awards by year
Tejano Music Awards
Tejano Music Awards
Tejano Music Awards
Tejano Music Awards